San Menna (Italian: Saint Menas) was an ancient church in Rome, formerly located along the Via Ostiensis which led to the Basilica of Saint Paul. It appears to have been destroyed at some point after the tenth century.

Location
In the eighth century, the anonymous pilgrim of Einsiedeln pointed out that there existed a church dedicated to the Egyptian martyr Saint Menas on the Ostian Way, a little before reaching the Basilica of Saint Paul. The church was connected to the famous portico that led from Porta San Paolo into the Ostian Basilica, as is evidenced from the pilgrimage itineraries of the seventh century: inde per porticum usque ad ecclesiam Mennae, et de Menna usque ad s. Paulum Apostolum. A precise location for the church may be next to a small bridge (ponticello) along the porticus that spanned the Almone, a small river that used to flow into the Tiber from the east, but is today diverted.

The church was one of a series of auxiliary structures that were built along the porticus on the Via Ostiensis. These included an oratory to Saint Euplius, which had been founded by Pope Theodore I (642–649) next to the gates, and a chapel dedicated to Saints Peter and Paul built by Pope Donus (678–678), which was later connected to the legendary meeting between the two saints before their martyrdom.

On the Wednesday after the fourth Sunday of Lent, when the station is held at the Basilica of Saint Paul, the collecta was held at this church of San Menna, meaning that the people and ministers of the city would meet there and prepare for the procession into the principal church for the day's liturgy. Armellini notes that documents of the sixteenth century make no mention of the church's status as a collect church.

History
The church of San Menna was very ancient, being first mentioned in an inscription from the year 589. At around that time, it is recorded that Gregory the Great (590–604) offered one of his Homilies on the Gospels (XXXVI) there. In his introduction to the homily, he gives a hint as to the relative location of the church: quia longius ab urbe digressi sumus, ne ad revertendum tardior hora praepediat.

The church was enriched with gifts by Pope Paschal I (817–824) and restored by Pope Leo IV (847–855), as is recorded in the biographies of those popes. Shortly after the tenth century, however, no further mention is made of it.

Bibliography

References and notes
Notes

References

Menna
Rome Q. X Ostiense